Estaimbourg is a village of Wallonia and a district of the municipality of Estaimpuis, located in the province of Hainaut, Belgium.

During the Middle Ages there was both a village and a castle in Estaimbourg. When the village was pillaged by French troops in 1478, they also destroyed the castle. In 1854, the de Bourgogne family built a new château on the ruins of the old castle, in a Neo-Gothic style. The village church is from the late 18th century. Historically, there has been a presence of leather industry in the village.

References

External links

Populated places in Hainaut (province)